Frederick Eley (1884 in Colchester, England – 1979) was an American architect.

He was the first registered architect of Santa Ana, California and is regarded as the area's most prolific and finest early architect.  He designed more than 30 schools and many other buildings.

A number of his works are listed on the National Register of Historic Places.

Works include (with spelling variations):
Ebell Society of Santa Ana Valley, 625 N. French St., Santa Ana, CA (Eley, Frederick), NRHP-listed
Irvine Park, 21401 Chapman Ave., Orange, CA (Eley, Frederick), NRHP-listed
Santa Ana Fire Station Headquarters No. 1, 1322 N. Sycamore St., Santa Ana, CA (Eley, Frederick), NRHP-listed
St. John's Lutheran Church, 185 S. Center St., Orange, CA (Fley, Frederick), NRHP-listed
Yost Theater-Ritz Hotel, 301-307 N. Spurgeon St., Santa Ana, CA (Eley, Fred), NRHP-listed
YMCA Santa Ana-Tustin, 205 W. Civic Center Dr., Santa Ana, CA (Eley, Frederick Harry), NRHP-listed
Masonic Lodge Building (Anaheim, California) (1913)
Knights of Pythias Building (Anaheim, California) (1913)

References

20th-century American architects
Architects from California
People from Colchester
1884 births
1979 deaths
British emigrants to the United States